is a Japanese athlete. He competed in the men's long jump at the 1956 Summer Olympics.

References

1932 births
Living people
Place of birth missing (living people)
Japanese male long jumpers
Olympic male long jumpers
Olympic athletes of Japan
Athletes (track and field) at the 1956 Summer Olympics
Asian Games silver medalists for Japan
Asian Games medalists in athletics (track and field)
Athletes (track and field) at the 1954 Asian Games
Medalists at the 1954 Asian Games